Margrethia obtusirostra, the Bighead portholefish, is a bristlemouth of the family Gonostomatidae, found in the tropical and subtropical Indo-Pacific and Atlantic oceans, at depths of between 100 and 600 m. Its length is between 5 and 8 cm.

References
 
 
 Tony Ayling & Geoffrey Cox, Collins Guide to the Sea Fishes of New Zealand,  (William Collins Publishers Ltd, Auckland, New Zealand 1982) 

Gonostomatidae
Taxa named by Åge Vedel Tåning
Fish described in 1919